Sea of green may refer to:

 Sea of Green, a Canadian rock band
 Sea of green (SOG), a method of Cannabis cultivation
 "Sea of Green", a song by the Sword from the album Used Future

See also
 Green Sea (disambiguation)
 "Yellow Submarine" (song), by the Beatles, produced in 1966
 Iranian Green Movement